KDSN (1530 kHz) is a commercial AM radio station serving the Denison, Iowa area. The station primarily broadcasts an agricultural programming and country music format. KDSN is licensed to Crawford County Broadcasting Corp.

External links

KDSN website

DSN (AM)
Country radio stations in the United States